"Great Wall of Sand" is a name first used in March 2015 by US Admiral Harry Harris, who was commander of the Pacific Fleet, to describe a series of uniquely large-scale land reclamation projects by the People's Republic of China (PRC) in the Spratly Islands area of the South China Sea in the period from late 2013 to late 2016.

2013–2016 Spratlys reclamations 
In late 2013, the PRC embarked on large scale reclamations at seven locations — in order to strengthen territorial claims to the region demarcated by the "nine-dash line".

The artificial islands were created by dredging sand onto reefs which were then concreted to make permanent structures. By December 2016 it had reached  and "'significant' weapons systems, including anti-aircraft and anti-missile systems" had been installed.

The PRC states that the construction is for "improving the working and living conditions of people stationed on these islands", and that, "China is aiming to provide shelter, aid in navigation, weather forecasts and fishery assistance to ships of various countries passing through the sea."

Defence analysts IHS Jane's states that it is a "methodical, well planned campaign to create a chain of air and sea-capable fortresses".  These "military-ready" installations include sea-walls and deep-water ports, barracks and notably include runways on three of the reclaimed "islands", including Fiery Cross Reef, Mischief Reef and Subi Reef.  Aside from geo-political tensions, concerns have been raised about the environmental impact on fragile reef ecosystems through the destruction of habitat, pollution and interruption of migration routes.

The Asia Maritime Transparency Initiative's "Island tracker" has listed the following locations as the sites of the PRC island reclamation activities:

Total reclaimed area by PRC on 7 reefs: approx.

Machinery used 
The PRC used hundreds of dredges and barges including a giant self-propelled dredger, the Tian Jing Hao. At 6,017 gross tons, with a dredging capacity of 4500 m3/h, it is credited as being the largest of its type in Asia. It has been operating on Cuarteron Reef, the Gaven Reefs, and at Fiery Cross Reef.

Strategic importance
More than half of the world's annual merchant fleet tonnage passes through the Strait of Malacca, Sunda Strait, and Lombok Strait, with the majority continuing on into the South China Sea. Tanker traffic through the Strait of Malacca leading into the South China Sea is more than three times greater than Suez Canal traffic, and well over five times more than the Panama Canal. The People's Republic of China (PRC) has stated its unilateral claim to almost the entire body of water.

Legal issues

Territorial waters of an artificial island 
As the Mischief and Subi Reefs were under water prior to reclamations, they are considered by the Third United Nations Conference on the Law of the Sea (UNCLOS III) as "sea bed" in "international waters". Although the PRC had ratified a limited UNCLOS III not allowing innocent passage of war ships, according to the UNCLOS III, features built on the sea bed cannot have territorial waters.

Environmental legal issues 
The PRC has ratified UNCLOS III; the convention establishes general obligations for safeguarding the marine environment and protecting freedom of scientific research on the high seas, and also creates an innovative legal regime for controlling mineral resource exploitation in deep seabed areas beyond national jurisdiction, through an International Seabed Authority and the common heritage of mankind principle.

Regional concept 
According to Chinese sources, the concept was invented in 1972 by the Bureau of Survey and Cartography of Vietnam under the Office of Premier Phạm Văn Đồng which printed out "The World Atlas" and said, "The chain of islands from the Nansha and Xisha Islands to Hainan Island, Taiwan Island, the Penghu Islands and the Zhoushan Islands are shaped like a bow and constitute a Great Wall defending the China mainland."

Reactions

States 
 Australia – Opposed to "any coercive or unilateral actions to change the status quo in the South and East China Sea", Australia continues to fly routine surveillance operations and exercise the right to freedom of navigation in international airspace "in accordance with the international civil aviation convention, and the United Nations Convention on the Law of the Sea." Amid rising Australia-China diplomatic tensions in 2020, Australia strengthened its opposition by making a submission to the United Nations declaring the works are "completely unlawful" – following its ally the United States' position. 
 China – Following confrontations between US P8-A Poseidon aircraft and the Chinese Navy over the constructions in May 2015, China stated that it has "the right to engage in monitoring in the relevant air space and waters to protect the country's sovereignty and prevent accidents at sea."
 South Korea – No official stance, maintains an "increasingly notable silence on freedom of navigation in the South China Sea".
 United States – The construction is considered to be a key motivating factor behind the Obama administration's "Asia Pivot" military strategy. It believes "that China's activities in the South China Sea are driven by nationalism, part of a wider strategy aimed at undercutting US influence in Asia." It has declared that it would operate military aircraft in the region "'in accordance with international law in disputed areas of the South China Sea' and would continue to do so 'consistent with the rights freedoms and lawful uses of the sea.'"

Since October 2015, when the USS Lassen passed close to man-made land built upon Subi Reef, the US has been conducting freedom of navigation operations (FONOP) near the artificial islands approximately every three months using Arleigh Burke-class Guided missile destroyers.
In 2020 amid rising diplomatic and economic tensions in US-China relations, America declared that, "Beijing's claims to offshore resources across most of the South China Sea are completely unlawful, as is its campaign of bullying to control them."

Organizations
 ASEAN – The Association of Southeast Asian Nations stated that the constructions "may undermine peace, security and stability" in the region as well as having strongly negative impact on the marine environment and fishery stocks.   
 G7 – In a "Declaration on maritime security" before the 41st G7 summit, the G7 stated that, "We continue to observe the situation in the East and South China Seas and are concerned by any unilateral actions, such as large scale land reclamation, which change the status quo and increase tensions. We strongly oppose any attempt to assert territorial or maritime claims through the use of intimidation, coercion or force.
 In July 2016, the Permanent Court of Arbitration in The Hague issued a decision stating that China has no historic title over the area.

Ecological impact 

Aside from geo-political tensions, concerns have been raised about the environmental impact on fragile reef ecosystems through the destruction of habitat, pollution and interruption of migration routes. Frank Muller-Karger, professor of biological oceanography at the University of South Florida, said sediment "can wash back into the sea, forming plumes that can smother marine life and could be laced with heavy metals, oil and other chemicals from the ships and shore facilities being built." Such plumes threaten the biologically diverse reefs throughout the Spratlys, which Dr. Muller-Karger said may have trouble surviving in sediment-laden water.

Rupert Wingfield-Hayes, visiting the vicinity of the Philippine-controlled island of Pagasa by plane and boat, said he saw Chinese fishermen poaching and destroying the reefs on a massive scale. As he saw Chinese fishermen poaching endangered species like massive giant clams, he noted "None of this proves China is protecting the poachers. But nor does Beijing appear to be doing anything to stop them. The poachers we saw showed absolutely no sign of fear when they saw our cameras filming them". He concludes: "However shocking the reef plundering I witnessed, it is as nothing compared to the environmental destruction wrought by China's massive island building programme nearby. The latest island China has just completed at Mischief Reef is more than 9km (six miles) long. That is 9km of living reef that is now buried under millions of tonnes of sand and gravel."

A 2014 United Nations Environment Programme (UNEP) report noted that "Sand is rarer than one thinks." "The average price of sand imported by Singapore was US$3 per tonne from 1995 to 2001, but the price increased to US$190 per tonne from 2003 to 2005". Although the Philippines and the PRC had both ratified the UNCLOS III, in the case of Johnson South Reef, Hughes Reef and Mischief Reef, the PRC dredged sand for free in the EEZ the Philippines had claimed from 1978, arguing this to be the "waters of China's Nansha Islands". "Although the consequences of substrate mining are hidden, they are tremendous. Aggregate particles that are too fine to be used are rejected by dredging boats, releasing vast dust plumes and changing water turbidity".

John McManus, a professor of marine biology and ecology at the University of Miami’s Rosenstiel School of Marine and Atmospheric Science, said: "The worst thing anyone can do to a coral reef is to bury it under tons of sand and gravel ... There are global security concerns associated with the damage. It is likely broad enough to reduce fish stocks in the world's most fish-dependent region." He explained that the reason "the world has heard little about the damage inflicted by the People's Republic of China to the reefs is that the experts can't get to them", and noted "I have colleagues from the Philippines, Taiwan, PRC, Vietnam and Malaysia who have worked in the Spratly area. Most would not be able to get near the artificial islands except possibly some from PRC, and those would not be able to release their findings".

See also 

 Foreign policy of China
 Great Wall of China
 Great Firewall
 Nine-dash line

References 

Territorial disputes of China
Land reclamation
South China Sea
Spratly Islands
Coral reefs
Artificial islands of Asia
Chinese irredentism